The Dr. James Penny Memorial Stakes is a Grade III American Thoroughbred horse race for fillies and mares that are three years old or older, over a distance of  miles on the turf held annually in July at Parx Casino and Racing racetrack in Bensalem, Pennsylvania. The event currently carries a purse of $200,000.

History 
The race was inaugurated in 2000 with an attractive purse offered of $100,000 as the Dr. James Penny Memorial Handicap. The event was named in honor of Dr. James Penny V.M.D. (1921–1999), the track veterinarian for over 25 years at Liberty Bell and stayed on  when thoroughbred racing moved to Keystone Race Track.

In 2012 the event was upgraded to a Grade III.

The 2018 running was moved off the turf track due to the conditions and run on a sloppy track.

Records
Speed record: 
  miles – 1:40.74  – Assateague   (2014)
 
Margins: 
  lengths – Divine Miss Grey  (2018)
Most Wins:

 2 – Princess Grace (2021, 2022)

Most wins by a jockey:

 2 – Heberto Castillo Jr. (2001, 2003)
 2 – Harry Vega (2004, 2007)
 2 – Joel Rosario (2013, 2014)
 2 – Joe Bravo (2017, 2021)

Most wins by a trainer:
 4 – William I. Mott (2001, 2003, 2006, 2008)
Most wins by an owner:

 2 – WinStar Farm (2000, 2008)
 2 – John and Susan Moore (2021, 2022)

Winners

See also
 List of American and Canadian Graded races

References 

Graded stakes races in the United States
Horse races in Pennsylvania
Grade 3 stakes races in the United States
Recurring sporting events established in 2000
Turf races in the United States
Parx Casino and Racing
2000 establishments in Pennsylvania